Carajás Airport  is the airport serving Parauapebas, Brazil, located in the Carajás Mining Complex.

During a transitional period, the airport is jointly operated by Infraero and AENA.

History
The airport was built by Companhia Vale do Rio Doce as a support the mining activities of Carajás Mine. It was commissioned on September 23, 1982. Since 1985 it is managed by Infraero.

Previously operated by Infraero, on August 18, 2022 the consortium AENA won a 30-year concession to operate the airport.

Airlines and destinations

Accidents and incidents
8 September 1987: a Brazilian Air Force Hawker Siddeley HS.125 registration FAB-2129 crashed upon take-off from Carajás. All nine occupants died.
14 February 1997: a Varig Boeing 737-241 registration PP-CJO operating flight 265, flying from Marabá to Carajás while on touch-down procedures at Carajás during a thunderstorm, had its right main gear collapsed rearwards causing the aircraft to veer off the right of the runway. The aircraft crashed into the forest. One crew member died.

Access

See also

List of airports in Brazil

References

External links

Airports in Pará
Airports established in 1982
1982 establishments in Brazil